Kokand (Chagatai: خوقند, Xuqand;) is a city in Fergana Region in eastern Uzbekistan, at the southwestern edge of the Fergana Valley. Administratively, Kokand is a district-level city, that includes the urban-type settlement Muqimiy. The population of Kokand  was approximately 259,700. It is nicknamed "City of Winds". In 1877 when the first ethnographic works were done under the new imperial Russian administration, Khoqand/Kokand was reported and visually depicted on their maps as Tajik inhabited oasis (C.E de Ujfalvy (“Carte Ethnographique du Ferghanah, 1877”). The city and the entire eastern 3/4 of the Fergana Valley were including in Uzbekistan in the 1920s and Stalin's dictates of political borders.

Kokand is at the crossroads of the two main ancient trade routes into the Fergana Valley, one leading northwest over the mountains to Tashkent, and the other west through Khujand. As a result, Kokand is the main transportation junction in the Fergana Valley.

Etymology 

The city's name is in conformity with other Central Asian cities that sport the element kand/kent/qand/jand, meaning a city in Sogdian as well as other Iranic languages. The Khwarazmian version was kath, which is still found in the name of the old city of Akhsikath/Akhsikat in the Fergana Valley of Uzbekistan. The prefix khu/hu is Iranic for "good." (modern Tajik khub.  Together, the name stands for "Good City." Flower in sanskrit

A Turkic derivation is untenable chronologically, but goes as such: "Kokand's name derives from the well-known tribal family group of 'Kokan' who belong to the Kongrat tribe of Uzbeks."

History 

The town of Kokand is one of the oldest towns in Uzbekistan and is situated in the western part of Fergana Valley. In the chronicles of the 10th century, the first written documents concerning town of Hukande, Havokande (old names of the town). In the 13th century, like most of Central Asian towns, the Mongols ruined the city. The town is a significant hub for trading on the Silk Route.

Kokand has existed since at least the 10th century, under the name of Khavakand, and was frequently mentioned in traveler's accounts of the caravan route between South Asia and East Asia. The Han Dynasty of China conquered the entire city in the 1st Century B.C. Later, the Arabs conquered the region from Tang Empire. The Mongols destroyed Kokand in the 13th century.

The present city began as a fort in 1732 on the site of another older fortress called Eski-Kurgan. In 1740, it became the capital of an Uzbek kingdom, the Khanate of Kokand, which reached as far as Kyzylorda to the west and Bishkek to the northeast. Kokand was also the major religious center of the Fergana Valley, boasting more than 300 mosques.

Imperial forces of Russian Empire under Mikhail Skobelev captured the city in 1883 which then became part of Russian Turkistan. During World War I, two revolutions happened in the Russian Empire. it was the capital of the short-lived (72 days) (1917–18) anti-Bolshevik Provisional Government of Autonomous Turkistan (also known as Kokand Autonomy). They sought co-operation from Ataman Dutov and Alash Orda. However, their emissary to the Amir of Bukhara achieved little.

In September 1918, the Bolsheviks burned down the city and massacred over ten thousand citizens.

Main sights

The Palace of Khudayar Khan 
The Palace of Khudayar Khan was built between 1863 and 1874 by ruler Muhammad Khudayar Khan. American diplomat Eugene Schulyer described it as being "much larger and more magnificent than any other [palace] in Central Asia.”

Khudayar Khan commissioned architect Mir Ubaydullo to build him a royal residence with 114 rooms set around seven courtyards. The ruler wanted his mother to live in one of the palace's grand buildings, but she refused and set up her yurt in a courtyard.

The facade of the building is decorated with mosaic tiles and an Arabic inscription above the entrance. The inscription translates as “The High palace of Seid Mohammad Khudayar Khan”.

Most of the palace, including its harem, was demolished by the Soviets, but 19 rooms remain in palace. These are open to the public, and the interiors have been partially restored. They show a combination of Russian and traditional Uzbek styles, and the exquisite craftsmanship of Kokand's 19th century artisans. It is possible to view the palace's collection of Chinese ceramics on request.

Juma Mosque 
Kokand's Juma Mosque (Friday Mosque) is located on Chursu Square in the historic Icheri Sheher part of the city. It was built between 1812 and 1818 by Muhammad Umar Khan, who was ruler of Kokand from 1810 until his death in 1822.

The mosque is built around a large courtyard and has a 100m long iwan supported on 98 redwood columns, which are ornately carved and were brought from India. The minaret is 22m high.

Although intended to be Kokand's main place of worship, the Juma Mosque remained shut for most of the 20th century. It then reopened after much needed restoration in 1989 and now houses a small museum of applied arts with displays of embroideries and ceramics.

Amin Beg Madrassah 
The Amin Beg Madrassah, a religious school, was built in the 1830s for a son of Madali Khan, the khan of Kokand from 1822 to 1842. The madrassah has a beautifully tiled facade, which was restored in 1913 by a craftsman called Khomol Khozi. For this reason, the madrassah is often called the Khomol Khozi Madrassah. Today, the building houses a small museum and a shop, but the tiles and the carved wooden columns are still impressive to look at.

Hamza Museum 
Built in 1989, the Hamza Museum is named after Hamza Hakimzade Niyazi, a Soviet hero who was born in Kokand. Hamza was Uzbekistan's first national poet and the founder of Uzbek social realism, and the museum was opened to commemorate the centenary of his birth. The museum houses general exhibits about life in Kokand, and also has artefacts relating to a variety of dramatists, propagandists, and writers.

Additional Sites 
There are three other historic madrassahs in Kokand. The 19th-century Shaib Mian Hazrat Madrasa has a small museum dedicated to the poet Mohammad Amin Muqimi (1850-1903).

The Narbutabey Madrassah was built in the 1790s. Its graveyard includes the tomb of Muhammad Umar Khan and his wife, the famous Uzbek poet Nodira. Known as the Modari Khan Mausoleum, it is ornately decorated with glazed blue mosaic tiles. Unlike the other madrassahs in Kokand which were closed by the Soviets, the Narbutabey Madrassah remained active as a place of Quranic study until 2016.

The last madrassah is the Dasturkahanchi Madrasa. It was built in 1833 as a school for boys, but it is now a training centre where girls learn embroidery.

 Dakhma-I-Shokhon, a necropolis of the Kokand Khans from the 1830.

Education and culture 

A number of madrasahs can be found with the city. Kokand made contribution to Islam. It is also home to a number of notable hanafi scholars, such as Abdulhafiz Al-Quqoniy and Yorqinjon Qori Al-Quqoniy.

There are 3 institutes there are "Kokand branch of Tshkent State Technical University(named after Islom Karimov)", "Kokand University(founded in 2019)",
"Kokand State Pedagocical Institute",  9 colleges and lyceums, 40 secondary schools, 5 musical schools, a theater, and 20 libraries. There are 7 historical and house museums located in Kokand.

The first International Handicrafters Festival took place in Kokand in September 2019. It was hosted by the Uzbekistan Handicraft Association, and the guest of honour was Rosy Greenlees, President of the World Crafts Council. More than 600 creatives from 70 countries participated.

The festival was created to enable artisans from around the world to demonstrate and sell their products, as well as to network and further develop their skills. The festival included conference sessions dedicated to developing hand craftsmanship. The crafts on display included musical instruments, painting, ceramics, textiles, metalwork, and woodwork.

It is planned that the festival will be a biennial event, and it will next take place in 2021.

Economy 
The black market provides nearly 75% of the income generated in the borders of the city. This includes retail, groceries, employment, money exchange, agriculture and manufacturing of many goods. A large part of the population works as small business owners in outdoor markets.

Kokand is a center for the manufacture of fertilizers, chemicals, machinery, and cotton and food products. Over the last two decades, new districts and public buildings have been created in the city as well as many houses, shops, cafes, restaurants and other private sector ventures. Kokand is an education center with one institute, nine colleges and lyceums, and numerous museums.

Notable people 
Muhammad Sharif Gulkhani, poet and satirist
Ziroatkhon Hoshimova, First Lady of Uzbekistan
Peter Mikhailovich Kulakov, television evangelist
Ida Mayrin (born 1997), Israeli Olympic rhythmic gymnast
Yodgor Nasriddinova, Uzbek-Soviet engineer and communist party official
Abdulla Qahhor, Uzbek writer
Hamza Hakimzade Niyazi, Uzbek poet and playwright
Saida Mirziyoyeva, Uzbek politician, eldest daughter of the President of Uzbekistan
Furqat, Uzbek poet
 Abraham Resnick, rabbi
 Serhiy Shkarlet, Ukrainian politician

References

External links 

 
 Official city portal of Kokand 

Populated places in Fergana Region
Cities in Uzbekistan
Populated places along the Silk Road
Fergana Oblast